Timeless: The All-Time Greatest Hits is a compilation album by the Bee Gees. It was released on 21 April 2017 by Capitol Records to coincide with the 40th anniversary of the Saturday Night Fever soundtrack. The album is a single-disc compilation of the group's biggest hits selected by the group's last surviving member, Barry Gibb. Gibb said of the compilation: "Although there are many other songs, these songs, I feel, are the songs that Maurice, Robin, and I would be most proud of."

Content
The album is a career spanning compilation featuring 21 tracks selected by Barry Gibb that ranges from their first Australian hit, "Spicks and Specks", to the group's international number one single, "You Win Again". Several hits are omitted, including "Holiday", "Run to Me", "Love So Right", "One" and "World".

Track listing
All compositions by Barry, Robin and Maurice Gibb, except as indicated.

Charts

Weekly charts

Year-end charts

Certifications

References

2017 greatest hits albums
Bee Gees compilation albums
Capitol Records compilation albums